This list comprises all players who participated in at least one league match for FC Cincinnati during the team's tenure in the United Soccer League season from 2016 to 2018.

A "†" denotes players who only appeared in a single match.

A "‡" denotes players who also played for FC Cincinnati after they joined Major League Soccer in 2019.

A
  Fanendo Adi ‡
  Fatai Alashe ‡
  Nazmi Albadawi ‡
  Tomi Ameobi

B
  Matt Bahner
  Paddy Barrett
  Austin Berry
  Corben Bone ‡

C
  Russell Cicerone
  Andy Craven
  Omar Cummings

D
  Kadeem Dacres
  Sem de Wit
  Harrison Delbridge
  Marco Dominguez

F
  Baye Djiby Fall
  Daryl Fordyce

G
  Tyler Gibson
  Kyle Greig

H
  Daniel Haber
  Garrett Halfhill
  Mitch Hildebrandt
  Antoine Hoppenot
  Justin Hoyte ‡

J
  Dallas Jaye
  Josu

K
  Dekel Keinan
  Pa Konate
  Danni König

L
  Lance Laing
  Forrest Lasso ‡
  Emmanuel Ledesma ‡
  Evan Lee
  Derek Luke

M
  Victor Mansaray
  Cristian Martínez †
  Jimmy McLaughlin ‡
  Pat McMahon
  Omar Mohamed

N
  Francisco Narbón
  Evan Newton
  Paul Nicholson

O
  Sean Okoli

P
  Tyler Polak

Q
  Aodhan Quinn

R
  Spencer Richey ‡
  Álvaro Antón Ripoll
  Richie Ryan

S
  Kevin Schindler
  Will Seymore
  Blake Smith
  Luke Spencer
  Eric Stevenson

T
  Mélé Temguia †
  Ross Tomaselli
  Casey Townsend

W
  Kenney Walker
  Emery Welshman ‡
  Andrew Wiedeman

Cincinnati
 
Association football player non-biographical articles